Rhiannon is a feminine Welsh given name (pronounced ) and may refer to:
Rhiannon Braund, New Zealand academic and registered pharmacist
Rhiannon Davies Jones, Welsh historical novelist
Rhiannon Giddens, American musician
Rhiannon Ifans, Welsh academic and author
Rhiannon Lassiter (born 1977), British writer
Rhiannon Jeffrey or Rhi Jeffrey (born 1986), American swimmer 
Rhiannon Roberts, Welsh footballer
Rhiannon Fish, Australian actress

Surname 

Lee Rhiannon (born 1951), Australian politician

See also
 Rhianna, variant feminine given name
Rhiannon in Welsh mythology
Rhiannon (disambiguation)
Rhian

English feminine given names
Feminine given names
Scottish feminine given names
Welsh feminine given names